The 1982 New Zealand Grand Prix was a race held at the Pukekohe Park Raceway on 9 January 1982. It was the 28th running of the New Zealand Grand Prix and was run over two heats of 30 laps each, with the final results being an aggregate of the two. The event was won by Brazilian Roberto Moreno. The podium was completed by Kiwis Steve Millen and Dave McMillan.

Classification

Heat 1

Heat 2

Combined results

References

Grand Prix
New Zealand Grand Prix
January 1982 sports events in New Zealand